Euporus is a genus of beetles belonging to the large subfamily Cerambycinae in the family of longhorn beetles (Cerambycidae).

Appearance 

Medium-sized, slender and long-legged, usually shiny and metallic longhorn beetle. The head is slightly snout-shaped and elongated. The antennae are usually longer than the body, and rather thin. The pronotum is rounded without teeth on the sides. The coverts are almost evenly wide. The hind legs are particularly long, the thighs thickened at the tip.

Life cycle

The larvae develop in the wood of deciduous trees.

Prevalence 

The genus is widespread in Africa.

Systematic division  

 Order Beetle, Coleoptera Linnaeus, 1758
 Suborder Polyphaga Emery, 1886
 group (infraorder) Cucujiformia Lameere, 1938
 Superfamily Chrysomeloidea Latreille, 1802 (=Phytophaga)
 Family longhorn beetles, Cerambycidae Latreille, 1802
 Subfamily Cerambycinae Latreille, 1802  
 Tribe Callichromatini Blanchard, 1845
 Genus Euporus Audinet-Serville, 1834
 Subgenus Euporus 
 Euporus abyssinicus Müller, 1939
 Euporus amabilis Hope, 1843
 Euporus dubius Schmidt, 1922
 Euporus gracilis Hintz, 1919
 Euporus illaesicollis Quedenfeldt, 1883
 Euporus itimbirensis Duvivier, 1891
 Euporus katanganus Burgeon, 1931
 Euporus laevis Schmidt, 1922
 Euporus linearis Schmidt, 1922
 Euporus liobasis (Bates, 1879)
 Euporus pygmaeus Schmidt, 1922
 Euporus similis Jordan, 1894
 Euporus strangulatus Audinet-Serville, 1834
 Euporus torquatus (Dalman, 1817)
 Subgenus Hintziellus Schmidt, 1922
 Euporus nasutus Quedenfeldt, 1882
 Euporus plagiatus (Dalman, 1817)
 Subgenus Meporus Schmidt, 1922
 Euporus kuntzeni Schmidt, 1922
 Subgenus Sphaleroporus Schmidt, 1922
 Euporus amethystinus Quedenfeldt, 1882
 Euporus conradtiellus Kolbe, 1894
 Euporus crucifer Schmidt, 1922
 Euporus cupreifrons (Aurivillius, 1914)
 Euporus ignicollis Pascoe, 1864
 Euporus partitus Gerstäcker, 1884
 Euporus tenellus (Bates, 1879)

References 

 List of species
 Catalogue of data, European, African, and Asiatic species

External links 

Cerambycinae
Beetles described in 1834
Beetle genera